Garden Networks is a not-for-profit organization registered in Canada, that specializes in providing Internet anti-censorship/Internet privacy products for free. The full name of Garden Networks is Garden Networks for Freedom of Information.

History
Garden Networks was started in 2001 by a group of computer software and network engineers. In the same year, the first version of their software tool "Garden" was released, aiming at providing Internet access to web sites blocked by the Chinese government, including web sites of news agencies such as BBC, VOA, and spiritual groups such as Falun Dafa. Along the years, Garden Networks has continued this effort and released product upgrades and new products, combating the escalating Internet blockade of the Chinese government.

The products of Garden Networks provide English and Chinese user interface and are also used by people in other countries to circumvent national Internet censorship or to improve Internet privacy and protect themselves from Internet identify theft.

Products

Garden
Garden is the first product release by Garden Networks. It works by providing an HTTP proxy server running on the user's local PC. The software then connects to one of the servers provided by Garden Networks to bypass firewalls at China's national gateway.

Garden provides an Internet Explorer Browser Helper Object (BHO) to enable a browser window to direct its traffic to the local proxy server. Activated by a blocked URL, Internet Explorer enters into a proxied mode automatically.

G2
A year after Garden was released, Garden Networks releases a new product called Garden G2. This software tool provides a different way of accessing the back-end servers, and a different way of engaging proxying. Unlike Garden, in G2, proxying is triggered by DNS resolution in order to provide support for a wider range of applications.

GTunnel

GTunnel is the latest product released in October 2007. It features a new transport protocol which enables GTunnel to provide local SOCKS proxy support, and new working modes. GTunnel version 1.1 provides a standard mode, which is the main working mode and provides the best data transfer performance by connecting to the back-end servers directly, a Skype mode, and a Tor mode that go through computers in these P2P network. GTunnel also has an improved user interface which features real-time traffic graphs.

GTunnel replaces the earlier Garden and G2 client software and becomes the main client software of Garden Networks.

GTunnel works on Linux through Wine support.

References

Internet privacy organizations
Politics and technology
Internet-related activism
Freedom of expression organizations
Internet access organizations
Technology companies of Canada
Networking companies of Canada
Human rights organizations based in Canada
Privacy in Canada